Dmytro Hrechyshkin (born 22 September 1991) is a Ukrainian professional footballer who plays as a midfielder for Gençlerbirliği.

Career
Hrechyshkin was the member of different Ukrainian national football teams. He also is member of Ukraine national under-21 football team for friendly match against Czech Republic national under-21 football team on 17 November 2010.

References

External links 
 
 

1991 births
Living people
People from Sievierodonetsk
Ukrainian footballers
Ukrainian expatriate footballers
Ukraine international footballers
FC Shakhtar Donetsk players
FC Mariupol players
FC Chornomorets Odesa players
FC Zorya Luhansk players
FC Oleksandriya players
Gençlerbirliği S.K. footballers
Ukrainian Premier League players
Süper Lig players
Association football forwards
Expatriate footballers in Portugal
Expatriate footballers in Turkey
Ukrainian expatriate sportspeople in Turkey
Ukraine youth international footballers
Ukraine under-21 international footballers
Sportspeople from Luhansk Oblast